The Höch Turm is a mountain in the Schwyzer Alps, located in an elevation of . It lies west of the resort village of Braunwald on the karstic range between the valleys of Muota and Linth.

Administratively, the mountain lies in the municipality of Muotathal, in the canton of Schwyz.

References

External links
 
 Höch Turm on Hikr

Mountains of Switzerland
Mountains of the Alps
Mountains of the canton of Schwyz